The women's 4 × 100 m medley relay 34 points event at the 2012 Summer Paralympics took place at the  London Aquatics Centre on 7 September. There were no heats in this event.

Results

Final
Competed at 20:47.

 
AM = Americas Record. AS = Asian Record. OC = Oceania Record.

References
Official London 2012 Paralympics Results: Final 

Swimming at the 2012 Summer Paralympics
2012 in women's swimming